The following is a list of notable events that are related to Philippine music in 2017.

Events

January
 After 13 years, Up Dharma Down officially renamed themselves as UDD.

March
 March 11 – Noven Belleza, a farmer from Visayas, was crowned as champion in Tawag ng Tanghalan.

April
 April 9 – Awra Briguela was declared the first winner of Your Face Sounds Familiar Kids.

June
 June 10 – Jhon Clyd Talili emerged as the grand champion of Tawag ng Tanghalan Kids that spanned for three months.
 June 12 – Billboard Philippines started compiling three official music charts: Philippine Hot 100, Philippine Top 20 and Catalog Chart.
 June 30 – Magic 89.9, 99.5 Play FM, Wave 89.1, 103.5 K-Lite and Jam 88.3 joined forces for a unified OPM concert series entitled One Sound, with its first event were held at the Eastwood Central Plaza.

July
 July 30 – Jona Soquite of Davao City won as the first The Voice Teens grand champion.

August
 August 1 – MTVph was launched on all cable/satellite providers in the Philippines. It is co-owned by Viacom International Media Networks Asia and Solar Entertainment Corporation.

September
 Coke Studio Philippines announced its lineup of contemporary and indie Filipino acts for its inaugural season, namely: Gab and John of Urbandub, The Ransom Collective, Ebe Dancel, Autotelic, Noel Cabangon, Curtismith, Gracenote, Abra, Moonstar88, Jensen and The Flips (later removed), Franco, Reese Lansangan, Sandwich, and BP Valenzuela.

October
 October 15 – ASAP launched an acoustic singing group named ASAP Jambayan, composed of Iñigo Pascual, Zia Quizon, Moira Dela Torre, Migz Haleco, Kaye Cal and Isabela Vinzon.

Debuts

Soloist
Zsaris
Kio Priest
Claudia Baretto
Volts Vallejo
Curtismith
Leila Alcasid
Donny Pangilinan
Noel Comia
Janina Vela
Gabbi Garcia
Aia De Leon

Duos/bands/groups
 BoybandPH
 Hey Joe Show
 Carousel Casualties
 Agsunta
 BennyBunnyBand
 IV of Spades
 Conscious and the Goodness

Reunions/comebacks
 Somedaydream
 Pedicab
 Taken by Cars
 Orange and Lemons
 Kamikazee

Albums released
The following albums are released in 2017 locally. Note: All soundtracks are not included in this list.

Concerts and music festivals

Note 1. KZ Tandingan, Taken by Cars, Techy Romantics, Cheats, Bullet Dumas and BP Valenzuela were originally part of the lineup but cancelled their performance due to uncertain reasons.

Note 2. Jensen and The Flips and Poor Taste were originally part of the lineup but dropped by organizers amid sexual harassment allegations.

Cancelled/postponed

Awarding ceremonies
 January 16 – 2nd Wish 107.5 Music Awards, organized by Wish 1075
 March 16 – Myx Music Awards 2017, organized by myx
 August 5 – MOR Pinoy Music Awards 2017, organized by MOR 101.9
 November 26 – 30th Awit Awards, organized by the Philippine Association of the Record Industry

References

 
Philippines
Music
Philippine music industry